Eduardus Hermannus Theresia Maria Nijpels (born 1 April 1950) is a Dutch politician of the People's Party for Freedom and Democracy (VVD) and nonprofit director.

Nijpels studied Civil law at the Utrecht University obtaining a Master of Studies in Law degree. Nijpels served as Chairman of the political youth organisation JOVD from February 1974 until November 1975. Nijpels worked as a civics teacher in Roosendaal from August 1974 until June 1977. After the election of 1977 Nijpels was elected as a Member of the House of Representatives on 8 June 1977 serving as a frontbencher chairing the House Committee on Law enforcement and spokesperson for Justice and the Ombudsman. After the Party Leader and Parliamentary leader Hans Wiegel announced he was stepping down he endorsed Nijpels as his successor and he was anonymously selected as his successor on 20 April 1982.

For the elections of 1982 Nijpels served as Lijsttrekker (top candidate) and following a cabinet formation with Christian-democratic Leader Ruud Lubbers formed the Cabinet Lubbers I with Nijpels opting to remain as Parliamentary leader. For the election of 1986 Nijpels again served as Lijsttrekker but shortly thereafter announced that he was stepping down following disappointed election results on 9 July 1986. After a cabinet formation the coalition continued and Nijpels was appointed as Minister of Housing, Spatial Planning and the Environment in the Cabinet Lubbers II taking office on 14 July 1986. After the election of 1989 Nijpels returned to the House of Representatives on 14 September 1989 and served as a frontbencher and spokesperson for Spatial Planning and the Environment. In March 1990 Nijpels was nominated as the Mayor of Breda serving from 1 April 1990 until 1 July 1995 when he was appointment as Director-General for the Occupational Health Service Agency of the Ministry of Social Affairs and Employment. In December 1998 Nijpels was nominated as the next Queen's Commissioner of Friesland serving from 1 January 1999 until 1 May 2008.

Nijpels semi-retired from active politics and became active in the private and public sectors as a corporate and non-profit director and served on several state commissions and councils on behalf of the government, and workes as a trade association executive serving as Chairman of the Engineering association from May 2008 until May 2015, the GeoBusiness association since September 2009 and for the Industry and Employers confederation (VNO-NCW) from July 2008 until March 2015 and became a Member of the Social and Economic Council in August 2014. Nijpels continues to be active an advocate, lobbyist and activist for Environmentalism, Sustainable development, Conservation and Climate change.

Decorations

References

External links

Official
  Drs. E.H.Th.M. (Ed) Nijpels Parlement & Politiek

 

 

 
 

 
 

 
 

 
 

 

 

 
 

 

 
 

 

 

 

 

 

 

 

 

 

 

1950 births
Living people
Commanders of the Order of Orange-Nassau
Climate activists
Dutch conservationists
Dutch corporate directors
Dutch lobbyists
Dutch nonprofit directors
Dutch nonprofit executives
Dutch public broadcasting administrators
Dutch trade association executives
Hybrid electric vehicle advocates
King's and Queen's Commissioners of Friesland
Knights of the Order of the Netherlands Lion
Leaders of the People's Party for Freedom and Democracy
Mayors in North Brabant
Members of the House of Representatives (Netherlands)
Members of the Social and Economic Council
Ministers of Housing and Spatial Planning of the Netherlands
Municipal councillors in North Brabant
People from Bergen op Zoom
People from Breda
People from Den Helder
People's Party for Freedom and Democracy politicians
Sustainability advocates
Utrecht University alumni
20th-century Dutch businesspeople
20th-century Dutch civil servants
20th-century Dutch educators
20th-century Dutch jurists
20th-century Dutch politicians
21st-century Dutch businesspeople
21st-century Dutch civil servants
21st-century Dutch jurists
21st-century Dutch politicians